Cedo may refer to:

People
 Cedo Simplex or Jon Courtney, British musician
 Čedo Antolić (1951–2019), Croatian spiritual poet and songwriter
 Čedo Grbić (1921–1994), Croatian Serb communist politician
 Čedo Maras (born 1959), Yugoslav football goalkeeper
 Čedo Nikolovski (born 1961), Yugoslav wrestler
 Čedo Vuković (1920–2014), Montenegrin writer

Other
 CEDO, Intercultural Center for the Study of Deserts and Oceans